As I Lay Dying is a 2013 American drama film directed and co-written by and starring James Franco, based on William Faulkner's 1930 novel of the same name. The film was screened in the Un Certain Regard Section at the 2013 Cannes Film Festival.

Premise
The story is based on the loss of a mother and the struggles the family endure by going the distance to her burial ground in her home town.

Cast
 James Franco as Darl Bundren
 Logan Marshall-Green as Jewel Bundren
 Danny McBride as Vernon Tull
 Tim Blake Nelson as Anse Bundren
 Ahna O'Reilly as Dewey Dell Bundren
 Beth Grant as Addie Bundren
 Jim Parrack as Cash Bundren
 Jesse Heiman as Jody
 Scott Haze as Skeet MacGowan

Production
James Franco decided to write a screenplay of the novel with a fellow Yale graduate student Matt Rager. The novel As I Lay Dying was described as a story impossible to be transformed into a film due to the multi-narrative voices within it. Franco saw this as a challenge and chose to depict the many voices through choices of styling, through camera edits. Faulkner told the story in a chorus of voices: 15 narrators in the 59 chapters. To locate an equivalent for the novel’s polyphonal scheme, Franco employed the use of narrative expressed through dialogue and voice overs.

Release
The film was originally scheduled for a theatrical release on September 27, 2013 but Millennium Films scrapped the plans. It was released on October 22, 2013 to iTunes and November 5, 2013 to DVD/VOD platforms.

Reception
The film received mixed reviews from critics, with praise and criticism focused on Franco's methods of presenting Faulkner's complex narrative. It holds a 40% approval rating on review aggregator Rotten Tomatoes, based on 30 reviews with an average rating of 4.7/10. Metacritic gives the film a weighted average score of 50 out of 100, based on 13 reviews, indicating "mixed or average reviews".

Kyle Smith of the New York Post was very harsh, declaring, "Franco dilutes the drama with first-year-film-student gimmicks, like split screens and slow motion, it just seems like a dull collection of pointless monologues from actors who can’t even be bothered to match up their accents." A. O. Scott of The New York Times said, "But in rushing in where wise men might fear to tread, Mr. Franco has accomplished something serious and worthwhile. His As I Lay Dying is certainly ambitious, but it is also admirably modest. The script, written by Mr. Franco with Matt Rager, tries to pare Faulkner's multivoiced narrative to a manageable essence."

References

External links
 
 

2013 films
2013 drama films
2013 direct-to-video films
Films based on works by William Faulkner
American drama films
Films directed by James Franco
Films based on American novels
2010s English-language films
2010s American films